This article is a collection of statewide public opinion polls that have been conducted relating to the Democratic presidential primaries, 2008. A graphic summary of the data in map form follows. For state and territory names abbreviated in the maps in this article, see: List of US postal abbreviations.

Polling

Poll summary and current pledged delegate count

Delegate table and polling data

The following table shows a summary of the most recent polling data for each state, as well as completed primary and caucus results. Totals for withdrawn candidates have been placed in the "Uncommitted/Other" and "Other" columns. The pledged delegate vote estimates come from each state's primary or caucus article. Click on the specific election (link) column to see the sources used in those articles.

† Barack Obama was not on the ballot in Michigan.
 On 24 August, the DNC gave Florida and Michigan full voting rights.

See also
Nationwide opinion polling for the Democratic Party 2008 presidential primaries

External links

 2008 Democratic National Convention Website – FAQ gives map with delegation information.
Pollster.com Graphs showing various primary and general polls
USAElectionPolls.com – Primary polling by state
Select2008 – Live issue-based and policy-based polling

2008 United States Democratic presidential primaries
Democratic